Demodex huttereri is a hair follicle mite found in the Meibomian glands of the striped field mouse, Apodemus agrarius.

References

Trombidiformes
Animals described in 1983